This is a list of Spanish television related events from 2011.

Events
 1 April – TV Channel Divinity is launched.
 6 July - Alberto Oliart resigns from Chairman of RTVE.

Debuts

Television shows

Ending this year

Changes of network affiliation

Deaths
 10 January - Juanito Navarro, 86, actor.
 27 January - Paco Maestre, 53, actor.
 19 February - Florinda Chico, 84, actress.
 22 February - Chari Gómez Miranda, 81, hostess.
 25 February - José Conde, 56, actor.
 13 March - Andrés Resino, 70, actor.
 9 April - Isabel Osca, 79, actress.
 25 April - María Isbert, 94, actress.
 4 September - Carlos Ballesteros, 75, actor.
 16 September - Jordi Dauder, 73, actor.
 17 December - Lorenzo de Rodas, 71, actor.

See also
 2011 in Spain
 List of Spanish films of 2011

References